Pinnakkanadu is a small town located about 40 km East of Kottayam on Kanjirappally-Erattupetta Road, in Kottayam district of Kerala, India. It is 8 km North of Kanjirappally towards Erattupetta, 7 km East of Paika and 15 km West of Mundakkayam.

Administration
The taluk (local government) headquarters is located at Meenachil, village headquarters at Kondoor and the District headquarters at Kottayam.This town is part of the Poonjar Legislative Assembly and Pathanamthitta LokSabha constituency

Taluk : Meenachil 
Local Body Type: Panchayath 
Name of Local Body: Thidanadu
Village : Kondoor

Economy
Local people mostly work as farmers, cultivating cash crops such as rubber and cocoa, and food crops such as cassava and plantain.

Villages and suburbs
Nearby places include Kalaketty, Mailady, Chettuthodu, Varyanikkadu, Chemmalamattam, Cherani, Manjikkulam, Njavallil- Nediyapala etc.

Transportation
Nearest Railway stations: Kottayam (40 km), Changanacherry (43 km) or Ettumanoor (30 km)
Nearest Airport is Cochin Airport (Nedumbasserry)- 70 km

Pinnakkanadu can be reached by road from Kanjirappally, Erattupetta or Paika.

Public institutions and registered offices 
Governmental

 Police Station Thidanadu
 Akshaya e Centre Pinnakkanadu

Banks

 The Kottayam District Co-operative Bank
 The Meenachil East Urban Co-operative Bank
 Thidanad Serive Co-operative Bank

Private Limited Companies

 Njanambika Communications Private Limited

Educational Institutions

 CMS LP School Thidanadu

References

Villages in Kottayam district